Schizothorax kozlovi is a species of ray-finned fish in the genus Schizothorax from China.

References 

Schizothorax
Fish described in 1903
Taxa named by Alexander Nikolsky